Salvatore Foti (born 8 August 1988) is an Italian football coach and former professional player. He is currently assistant coach at Roma.

Club career

Sampdoria
Foti started his professional career with Sampdoria, where he was occasionally featured under the guidance of Walter Novellino. Foti joined the club in mid-2005 after his previous team, Venezia, disbanded because of financial troubles.

Udinese
He was sold to Udinese in summer 2006 in a co-ownership deal for €2 million. At the same time Sampdoria acquired Fabio Quagliarella and Mirko Pieri for €1.5M and €0.5M respectively in co-ownership deal. He was loaned back to Sampdoria for the first half of 2006–07 season, and then to Serie B's Vicenza for the second half in order to give him the opportunity to play more first team football.

Foti started the 2007–08 season again with Sampdoria, mostly being featured as a backup player, being later loaned again to a Serie B club, this time Messina. In the summer of 2008, he was loaned to Treviso for the entire 2008–09 season.

Return to Sampdoria
Foti returned to Sampdoria in June 2009 for free. Foti then spent  seasons at Serie B teams Piacenza and Empoli. In January 2012 Foti was loaned to again to another Serie B team Brescia; while Juan Antonio joined Sampdoria definitely.

Lecce
In the summer of 2012, he joined Lega Pro Prima Divisione side Lecce following their relegation from the Serie A and subsequent expulsion from the Serie B. On his debut, he scored the opening goal and created the second for Cosimo Chiricò in a 2–0 win over San Marino, and scored his second goal a week later in a 3–1 win against Treviso. After scoring again in a 2–2 against Como, he made his first start for the club at home to Virtus Entella, and scored a hat trick, taking his tally to six goals from just one start and four substitute appearances.

Chiasso
Foti signed for Swiss side Chiasso in the summer of 2014. However, he failed to make any appearances due to a knee injury and after an equally appearance-less loan spell at Balerna, a lower division club, he retired in January 2016.

International career
Foti played all five matches of 2005 UEFA European Under-17 Football Championship. He also played seven friendlies for U17 team and twice in 2005 FIFA U-17 World Championship.

Coaching career
In July 2016 he became part of Marco Giampaolo's coaching staff at Sampdoria and later at Milan.

In January 2022, he was unveiled as the new assistant coach to José Mourinho at Roma.

Foti has taken charge of Roma's league matches on five occasions due to touch-line bans served by Mourinho and remains undefeated. In the 2021–22 season, he was the head coach against Atalanta and Spezia, with both games ending 1-0 to Roma. In the 2022–23 season, he oversaw Roma's 2-1 away win over Internazionale, their 1-0 home win against Bologna FC and their 2-2 draw against AC Milan at the San Siro.

References

External links
 
 
 FIGC archive  

Living people
1988 births
Footballers from Palermo
Association football forwards
Italian footballers
U.C. Sampdoria players
L.R. Vicenza players
Treviso F.B.C. 1993 players
A.C.R. Messina players
Udinese Calcio players
Piacenza Calcio 1919 players
Empoli F.C. players
Brescia Calcio players
FC Chiasso players
Serie A players
Serie B players
Serie C players